United Nations Security Council resolution 852, adopted unanimously on 28 July 1993, after recalling previous resolutions on the topic including 501 (1982), 508 (1982), 509 (1982) and 520 (1982) as well as studying the report by the Secretary-General on the United Nations Interim Force in Lebanon (UNIFIL) approved in 426 (1978), the Council decided to extend the mandate of UNIFIL for a further six months until 31 January 1994.

The Council then reemphasised the mandate of the Force and requested the Secretary-General Boutros Boutros-Ghali to report back on the progress made with regard to the implementation of resolutions 425 (1978) and 426 (1978).

See also 
 Operation Accountability
 Israeli–Lebanese conflict
 List of United Nations Security Council Resolutions 801 to 900 (1993–1994)
 South Lebanon conflict (1985–2000)

References

External links
 
Text of the Resolution at undocs.org

 0852
 0852
1993 in Israel
1993 in Lebanon
 0852
July 1993 events
South Lebanon conflict (1985–2000)